The German XXXVIII Corps (XXXVIII Armeekorps) was a German army corps during World War II.

On 8 January 1945, the XXXVIII Corps was redesignated as the XXXVIII Tank Corps (XXXVIII Panzerkorps).

Commanders
 Field Marshal (Generalfeldmarschall) Erich von Manstein - 1 February 1940 to 28 February 1941
 Infantry General (General der Infanterie) Friedrich-Wilhelm von Chappuis - 15 March 1941 to 23 April 1942
 Infantry General (General der Infanterie) Siegfried Haenicke - 23 April 1942 to 29 June 1942
 Artillery General (General der Artillerie) Kurt Herzog - 29 June 1942 to 8 January 1945
 Artillery General (General der Artillerie) Horst von Mellenthin - 8 January 1945 to 16 March 1945 (as the XXXVIII Tank Corps)
 Artillery General (General der Artillerie) Kurt Herzog - 16 March 1945 - 10 May 1945

Area of operations
 Germany - January 1940 to June 1940
 France - June 1940 to June 1941
 Eastern Front, northern sector - June 1941 to October 1944
 Courland Pocket - October 1944 to 10 May 1945

References

Army,38
Military units and formations established in 1940
Military units and formations disestablished in 1945